Andoni Island is regarded as the most endemic island in Nigeria. Located at eastern fringe of the oil-rich Niger Delta in Rivers State, it is a picturesque barrier island carefully crafted by nature in resemblance of the shape of a Shark . Andoni island, perhaps the only island in Nigeria where forest elephant is found, is also a nesting ground for different species of sea turtles. Apart from Andoni island, there are many other islands in Andoni Local Government Area of Rivers State. Also, migratory dolphin species usually visit the Atlantic shores of the island during summer. According to a local conservationist on the Island, Gogo Abel Ujile, says that the Island is suitable for the creation of Andoni Elephant Sanctuary and Marine national park to help preserve the much threatened ecosystem.

References

External links
, IUCN report on conservation, Protection plan, Studies on impact on wildlife, IUCN Systems,  

Islands of Rivers State